Mbithi Masya is a film maker, artist and writer born in Nairobi, Kenya.

He was part of the experimental collective Just a Band, where he produced the videos for Hahe (known for reprising the character Makmende), Matatizo and other songs. His most recent work is the film Kati Kati, which won awards at the Toronto Film Festival and was submitted to the Academy Awards as Kenya's official submission for a foreign language film.

References 

1985 births
Living people
Kenyan film directors
People from Nairobi